Provia is a brandname for a pair of daylight-balanced color reversal films (slide film) produced by the Japanese film company Fujifilm. It is currently available in one speed, 100/21°, marketed as Fujichrome Provia 100F Professional [RDP III],. An additional speed of 400/27°, marketed as Fujichrome Provia 400X Professional [RXP], was previously available.

Details
Provia 100F [RDP III] was developed to replace Provia 100 [RDP II] and Provia 400X [RXP] was developed to replace Provia 400F [RHP III], improving on colour image storage permanence and colour fading resistance. Provia has less saturated colors and contrast compared to Velvia.

Provia 100F [RDP III] is available in 135 and 120 formats, as well as  rolls and various sheet sizes. Provia 400X was only available in 135 and 120 formats prior to discontinuation.

Both films have the ability to be pushed/pulled from −1/2 stop to +2 stops. Provia is also a favored film for cross processing.

Neither film requires reciprocity compensation between 1/4000 sec and one minute, with Provia 100F [RDP III] able to last up to two minutes. These longer times make the films particularly suitable for multiple exposures.

Provia 400X [RXP] used what Fujifilm described as Epitaxial Sigma Crystal (ESC) technology to achieve a granularity of RMS11.

See also
 Sensia
 
 Velvia
 Fortia
 List of photographic films

References

External links
 

Fujifilm photographic films